Martin Chorý (born 28 August 1970) is a retired Czech forward.

References

1970 births
Living people
Czech footballers
SK Hanácká Slavia Kroměříž players
AFK Atlantic Lázně Bohdaneč players
Association football forwards